The Upper Hudson AVA is an American Viticultural Area located to the north and west of Albany, New York. It is approximately 1650 square miles with nearly 65 acres of vines planted and 19 vineyards. It includes parts or all of seven counties in upstate New York, specifically Albany, Montgomery, Rensselaer, Saratoga, Schenectady, Schoharie and Washington.

History
The petition for the AVA was accepted as perfected by the Alcohol and Tobacco Tax and Trade Bureau (TTB) on July 30, 2015. On April 9, 2018 the proposed establishment of the Upper Hudson Viticultural Area was published in the Federal Register and removed from TTB's list of pending AVA's. From April 9, 2018 to June 9, 2018, the document was open for public comment. On December 6, 2018 the Final Ruling was published in the Federal Register with an effective date of January 7, 2019.

Upon completion of the rulemaking process, TTB allows wineries in the AVA to use the term "Estate Bottled" or use the "Upper Hudson" AVA name on the wine label. According to the TTB regulations Estate Bottled requires that 100% of the wine came from grapes grown on land owned by or controlled by the winery, which must be located in the viticultural area.  The winery must crush and ferment the grapes and finish, age and bottle the wine in a continuous process on the premise.

Upper Hudson Wine Trail
The Upper Hudson Wine Trail legislation was passed by the New York State Senate and Assembly during the 2017 Legislative session.    For the 2016-17 legislative session Assemblywoman Carrie Woerner, Senator Kathy Marchione and Wine Trail President Andrew Weber worked to get passage of the bill. It was signed into law by Governor Cuomo on August 21, 2017.  The process began in the fall of 2015 after the AVA petition had been accepted as perfected by TTB. During the 2015-16 New York legislative session the Upper Hudson Wine Trail was introduced as A10609 and S8052 where it was passed by the Senate.

Regional Grapes
The principal varieties of grapes being grown and used in the winemaking process include Marquette and Frontenac for the reds and La Crescent and La Crosse for the whites.  Many other varieties of cold hardly grapes have been developed by the University of Minnesota or the New York State Agricultural Experiment Station in Geneva, New York.  Some of these new varieties can withstand temperatures of -35F.

Climate

The region has two major rivers running through it, the Hudson River and the Mohawk River.  It is bounded by the Taconic Mountains to the east, the Adirondack Mountains to the North and West and the Catskill Mountains to the south. The defining feature of the region which distinguished it from the surrounding areas is Growing Degree Days (GDD), as shown in the chart.  The Cumulative GDD chart displays data from 19 locations from September 1 to October 31.  Being that the data is a three-year average, more than 10,000 data points are used. Those locations within the AVA are represented with dotted lines.  Those locations outside the region are solid lines.  The five temperature locations within the AVA and a location just out side the AVA (Schoharie) all lie in a grouping that plateaus at approximately 2500 GDD. The warmer locations along bodies of water have a greater GDD average and those areas in the various mountains surrounding the AVA have a lower GDD. The climate zones for the Upper Hudson AVA are predominantly zone 5A and 5B.  South of the city of Albany, NY and along the Hudson River is zone 6A.

Geology
The Upper Hudson region is an area rich in geologic/tectonic activity. Over the course of history the Adirondack Mountains, Allegheny Plateau, Taconic Mountains and the Mohawk and Hudson Rivers all have been produced by this activity.  These features are the results of different tectonic movements and these features have created the topography that make up the Upper Hudson region and lends itself to creating the distinct differences from the surrounding areas. 
Most of New York State is under laid by sedimentary rocks: sandstone, shale, limestone and conglomerate. This is due to the fact that for much of New York States geologic history it was under water. 475 MYA seas covered all of New York and most of the eastern half of proto North America. During the Paleozoic era from 500 to 300 million years ago (MYA), very thick limestone deposits formed, nearly two thousand feet of sedimentary rock was deposited at the bottom of that ancient sea. Today those rock layers are visible in many places.
Approximately 300MYA the tectonic plate movements that gave rise to the Allegheny Plateau and the Taconian Orogeny began to shape the region and began to create dry land.  The Adirondack Mountains are a relatively new feature that was formed in the last 10 to 20 million years due to an uplifting or dome. The Adirondacks continue to grow today at a rate of approximately 2.0 to 3.0 mm per year.  These three features along with the Hudson and Mohawk rivers give the region its characteristics.
The second historic event is the ice sheets that advanced and retreated over the region numerous times, the Laurentide Ice Sheet.  These ice sheets which at some time were more than 3 miles thick moved and deposited much of the overlaying soils in the region. They also changed some of the features developed from the much earlier tectonic movements and help to erode vast quantities of rock. They are the force that created the Finger Lakes.   These ice sheet also contributed to the formation Lake Albany, a 160-mile inland body of water that stretched from Glens Falls NY to Poughkeepsie NY, but eventually drained.

Vineyards
The vineyards within the AVA include, Altamont Vineyards, Capoccia Vineyards, Creek Haven Vineyard, Dusenberry Vineyards, Engle's Vineyard, Fossil Stone Vineyards, Galway Rock Vineyard, Helderberg 1839 Vineyard, Helderberg Meadworks, Hummingbird Hills Vineyard, Ledge Rock Hill Winery, MaCauley Creek Vineyard, Clover Pond Vineyard, Northern Cross Vineyard, Pellegrino Vineyards, Redstone Ridge Vineyard, Schernau Estate's Vineyard, South Dominion Vineyard and Victory View Vineyard.

References

Further reading
 Schenectady Daily Gazette
 Adirondack Almanac
 Saratoga Living

 Times Union of Albany Upper Hudson Wine Trail press release
 Upper Hudson AVA Petition Wine Business

 Albany Business Review Upper Hudson Wine Region
 Wine and Craft Beverage News Upper Hudson AVA Final
 The Saratogian Upper Hudson AVA
 News 10 Albany Upper Hudson AVA

External links 
 Upper Hudson Final Rule

 Alcohol and Tobacco Tax and Trade Bureau AVA definition

 New York Wine and Grape Foundation AVA's
 Upper Hudson Wine Region Map

American Viticultural Areas
New York (state) wine
2019 establishments in New York (state)
Hudson River
Albany, New York